Ridan (February 21, 1959 – 1977) was an American Thoroughbred racehorse who in 1961 was one of the best two-year-old colts racing in the United States but lost the 1962 U.S. Champion Three-Year-Old honors by a fraction of a nose.

A full brother to 1965 U.S. Horse of the Year Moccasin, Ridan was the grandson of Nasrullah, a son of Nearco. Trainer Moody Jolley purchased him from Claiborne Farm as a yearling. Because the colt reminded Jolley of another Nasrullah colt named Nadir, he named him Ridan, which is Nadir spelled backwards. Ernest Woods and John L. Greer each bought a one-third interest in the horse.

Trained by Jolley's son LeRoy, and ridden by future U.S. Hall of Fame jockey Bill Hartack, the two-year-old Ridan went unbeaten in seven starts in 1961 that included the important Arlington Futurity and Washington Park Futurity. Soreness in a foreleg cut short his season, and although he had handily beaten another two-year-old star, Crimson Satan, the 1961 U.S. Juvenile Champion honors went to Crimson Satan. The choice was hotly debated in racing circles. Hartack said Ridan was the best two-year-old he had ever ridden or seen. A number of expert racing observers agreed, saying that Ridan was the best two-year-old they had ever seen. The following year at age three, Ridan settled the issue, beating Crimson Satan seven more times by an average of eight lengths in each race and retiring without ever losing to him.

In 1962, Ridan won the Hibiscus Stakes in record time, then won the Blue Grass Stakes and the Florida Derby. Made the heavy favorite going into the Kentucky Derby, Ridan wound up third after running wide in a hard-fought race in which he and Roman Line finished a neck behind upset winner Decidedly. Disappointment followed in the Preakness Stakes, the second leg of the U.S. Triple Crown. Ridan lost by the then-narrowest, and still second-narrowest, margin in Preakness history, beaten by a nose by Brandywine Stable longshot Greek Money.

One of American Horse Racing's Top 100 Moments
In the 1962 Travers Stakes at the Saratoga Race Course, Ridan lost by a fraction of a nose in track-record time to the George D. Widener Jr. colt Jaipur. Still written and talked about today, the race is listed in the 2006 book Horse Racing's Top 100 Moments, written by the staff of Blood-Horse Publications. The race result determined which colt was named the 1962 U.S. Champion Three-Year-Old Horse.

At age four, Ridan raced only three times but got his revenge when he beat Jaipur, as well as the great Kelso, in the Palm Beach Handicap at Hialeah Park. An ankle injury brought Ridan's racing career to an end, and he was sent to stand at stud in Kentucky. Only moderately successful as a sire, Ridan was eventually sent to a breeding operation in Australia, where he died in 1977 from a twisted intestine.

References
 Horse Racing's Top 100 Moments (2006) Eclipse Press 
 Thoroughbred Times article on the 1962 Travers Stakes
 Ridan's pedigree and stats

1959 racehorse births
1977 racehorse deaths
Racehorses bred in Kentucky
Racehorses trained in the United States
Thoroughbred family 5-h